Liam Highfield (born 1 December 1990) is an English professional snooker player. He turned professional in 2010 after finishing second in the 2009/2010 PIOS rankings. He plays left-handed.

Career

Amateur years
In the 2007/2008 season, Highfield won the last event of International Open Series, and finished 12th in the rankings. The following season he finished as number 33.

In the 2009/2010 season, he won the second event and was runner-up in the first and sixth event of the International Open Series and finished second in the rankings. Thus, Highfield received a place on the 2010/2011 professional Main Tour.

2011/2012 season
At the beginning of this season, Highfield was ranked number 68 in the world, meaning he was required to win four qualifying matches to reach the main stage of the ranking events. He did not manage this throughout the season, coming closest in the first event of the year, the Australian Goldfields Open. He beat Simon Bedford and Xiao Guodong both by deciding frames and received a bye through to the final qualifying round because Steve Davis withdrew. There he lost to Dominic Dale 3–5. He could only win three more matches in qualifying for the remainder of the season and finished it ranked number 66, out of the top 64 who retained their places for the 2012/2013 season.

However, Highfield's performances in the 10 PTC events he played in (where he reached the last 16 twice) were enough to ensure him a spot on the tour for next year.

2012/2013 season
Highfield reached the final qualifying round of ranking events on two occasions during the 2012/2013 season. The first of these was in World Open qualifying in December, where he beat Daniel Wells 5–2, Barry Pinches 5–1 and Liang Wenbo 5–4. He faced 2002 world champion Peter Ebdon in the final round and, in a match which lasted five hours and 40 minutes, Highfield was edged out 4–5. His other run to the last round was in World Championship qualifying, which saw him defeat Simon Bedford 10–6, Pinches and Jamie Jones both by 10–9 scorelines, before losing 4–10 to Marcus Campbell. Throughout the season Highfield played in nine of the ten Players Tour Championship events, with his best result coming in the sixth European Tour Event, where he saw off Yu Delu, Tony Drago and Dominic Dale, but then lost 1–4 to Kurt Maflin in the last 16. He was placed 69th on the PTC Order of Merit and dropped 10 places in the world rankings during the season to end it world number 76.

2013/2014 season

In his opening match, Highfield defeated Barry Pinches 5–2 to qualify for the 2013 Wuxi Classic in China where narrowly lost 5–4 to Mark Williams in the first round. He also qualified for the Indian Open but withdrew from the event before it began. Highfield received automatic entry into both the Welsh Open and UK Championship as all 128 players on the snooker tour began these events in the first round, but he lost on both occasions. His disappointing season saw him finish 83rd in the world rankings and, as Highfield had now been relegated from the main tour, he played in Q School to regain his place. Highfield beat Canada's Alex Pagulayan in his final match of the second event to earn a new two-year tour card for the 2014/2015 and 2015/2016 seasons.

2014/2015 season
Highfield won four matches to qualify for the 2014 Australian Goldfields Open, but lost 5–2 to Xiao Guodong in the first round. He also made his debut at the International Championship where he was beaten 6–4 by Marco Fu in the first round. Highfield's first win at a ranking event of his career came at the UK Championship when he defeated Jamie Jones 6–3, before losing 6–4 to Mark Davis in the second round. He saw off Fu 5–2 to qualify for the German Masters and was 4–3 ahead of Xiao in the opening round, but lost 5–4 having led 47–0 and 50–0 in the last two frames. Highfield had his best run in a European Tour event this season at the Gdynia Open when he knocked out the likes of Stuart Bingham and Mark Selby to reach the last 16, where Mark Williams beat him 4–2. This helped Highfield finish 38th on the Order of Merit. Highfield's sixth and final appearance at a ranking event this year was the China Open and he lost 5–1 to Ryan Day in the first round.

2015/2016 season
Highfield advanced to the final qualifying round for the Shanghai Masters by beating Michael Wild 5–0, Robin Hull 5–2 and Ken Doherty 5–0, but he lost 5–2 to Martin Gould. However, he could only pick up one match win between August until the Gdynia Open in February 2016. There, Highfield defeated Anthony McGill 4–2, Stuart Carrington 4–0 and Robin Hull 4–3 (on the final black after being 3–0 down). He lost in the last 16 4–1 to Gould, but by finishing 65th on the Order of Merit he earned the final two-year tour card on offer to players outside of the top 64 in the world rankings. 10–2 and 10–8 victories over Luke Simmonds and Luca Brecel respectively saw Highfield stand one match away from qualifying for the World Championship. He was 4–0 down to Sam Baird but recovered to be just 5–4 behind and would go on to narrowly lose 10–9.

2016/2017 season
By eliminating Luca Brecel 4–2 and Sean Harvey and Ricky Walden both 4–3, Highfield reached the last 16 of a ranking event for the first time at the Paul Hunter Classic, where he lost the final two frames against Mark Davis to be beaten 4–3. Another last 16 appearance came at the UK Championship by defeating Thepchaiya Un-Nooh 6–5, Wang Yuchen 6–5 and Peter Lines 6–2. Highfield had a chance of reaching the quarter-finals when he led Mark Williams 5–4, but lost 6–5. Highfield had a 4–1 win over Tom Ford at the Scottish Open, before losing by a reversal of this scoreline in the second round to Marco Fu.

Performance and rankings timeline

Career finals

Amateur finals: 4 (2 titles)

References

External links

Liam Highfield at worldsnooker.com
 
 Global Snooker Profile

1990 births
Living people
English snooker players
Sportspeople from Swindon